Schwabe is a German language habitational surname for someone from Swabia. Notable people with the name include:
 Carlos Schwabe (1866–1926), Swiss Symbolist painter and printmaker
 Frank Schwabe (1970), German politician
 George B. Schwabe (1886–1952), American politician
 Gustav Christian Schwabe (1813–1897), German-born merchant and financier 
 Hartmut Schwabe (1943), German sprinter
 Heinrich Schwabe (1789–1875) German astronomer
 Joachim Schwabe (1983), German former footballer
 Johann Joachim Schwabe (1714–1784), German academic, poet and translator
 Julie Schwabe (1818–1896), German philanthropist and school founder
 Max Schwabe (1905–1983), U.S. Representative from Missouri
 Mike Schwabe (1964), American retired pitcher in Major League Baseball

See also 
 Schwab 
 Schwob

References 

German-language surnames
Ethnonymic surnames